The Rio de Janeiro Brazil is a temple of the Church of Jesus Christ of Latter-day Saints (LDS Church) in Rio de Janeiro, Brazil. It is the eighth dedicated temple in Brazil.

History
The intent to construct the temple was announced by church president Thomas S. Monson on April 6, 2013, during the church's semi-annual general conference.  The temple was announced concurrently with the Cedar City Utah Temple; at the time, the announcement brought the total number of temples worldwide to 170. 

On March 4, 2017, a groundbreaking ceremony to signify beginning of construction took place with Claudio R. M. Costa presiding. On February 12, 2020, the LDS Church announced that a public open house was scheduled to be held from April 17 through May 2, 2020 with a dedication on May 17, 2020. Just over a month later, as a result of other adjustments due to the COVID-19 pandemic, those arrangements were postponed until large public gatherings were again permitted by the Brazilian government. On November 5, 2021, the church announced that a public open house would be held from March 26 through April 16, 2022, The temple was dedicated by Gary E. Stevenson of the Quorum of the Twelve, on May 8, 2022.

See also

 Comparison of temples of The Church of Jesus Christ of Latter-day Saints
 List of temples of The Church of Jesus Christ of Latter-day Saints
 List of temples of The Church of Jesus Christ of Latter-day Saints by geographic region
 Temple architecture (Latter-day Saints)
 The Church of Jesus Christ of Latter-day Saints in Brazil

References

External links
Rio de Janeiro Brazil Temple Official site
 Rio de Janeiro Brazil Temple at ChurchofJesusChristTemples.org

Temples (LDS Church) in Brazil
Religious buildings and structures in Rio de Janeiro (state)
Buildings and structures in Rio de Janeiro (city)
Proposed religious buildings and structures of the Church of Jesus Christ of Latter-day Saints
21st-century Latter Day Saint temples
Proposed buildings and structures in Brazil